Muhammad Nazmi bin Ahmad (born 22 February 1998) is a Malaysian footballer who plays as a centre-back for Perak.

Career statistics

Club

References

External links
 

1998 births
Living people
Malaysian footballers
Perak F.C. players
Malaysian people of Malay descent
Association football defenders